Deck Dogz is a 2005 Australian skater film, written and directed by Steve Pasvolsky and starring Sean Kennedy, Ho Thi Lu and Richard Wilson with a guest appearance by Tony Hawk. It was filmed in and around Adelaide and Sydney, Australia. Deck Dogz was released in Australian theatres on 6 January 2005.

At the ARIA Music Awards of 2005 the soundtrack was nominated for Best Original Soundtrack, Cast or Show Album.

Plot
It is a movie about three teen skaters, played by young Australian actors Richard Wilson, Sean Kennedy and Ho Thi Lu. Their characters Poker, Spasm and Blue Flame, are trying to escape the law, their school, their parents, their demons and a couple of low-life criminals (Brendan Cowell as Kurt and Mitchell McMahon as Pigeon) to realise their burning ambition – to meet world class skating champion, Tony Hawk and compete in his skating competition at the Beachbowl, a major skate competition at Maroubra Beach, in the hope he'll sponsor them. The movie details their skating journey across Sydney's half-pipes and suburbs.

Cast

Deck Dogz: Original Motion Picture Soundtrack
Track listing
Songwriters according to Australasian Performing Right Association (APRA), with performers listed after track times.
 "Introduction" (1:30)
 "Sayonara" (Phil Jamieson, Johnny Klimek, Reinhold Heil) (4:15) Phil Jamieson
 "No Man's Land" (NFamas, Johnny Klimek, Reinhold Heil) (3:10) NFamas
 "One Way" (Cameron Baines, Johnny Klimek, Reinhold Heil) (3:31) Cameron Baines
 "Dry Land" (Bruce Winter) (2:46) Bruce Winter
 "Freedom Skate" (Luke Steele, Johnny Klimek, Reinhold Heil) (5:30) Luke Steele
 "Sayonara" (remix) (Phil Jamieson, Johnny Klimek, Reinhold Heil) (2:02)
 "Nothing To Say" (Antiskeptic) (3:03)
 "Murder One" (NFamas, Mass, Johnny Klimek, Reinhold Heil) (2:54) NFamas
 "Going Away" (Rocket Science) (3:24)
 "Breaking Out" (Cameron Baines, Johnny Klimek, Reinhold Heil) (3:17) Cameron Baines
 "Cycles" (Bruce Winter) (3:11) Bruce Winter
 "No Regrets" (Cameron Baines, Johnny Klimek, Reinhold Heil) (3:25) Cameron Baines
 "Night Activities" (Johnny Klimek, Reinhold Heil) (3:40)
 "Mall Chase" (Johnny Klimek, Reinhold Heil) (3:31)
 "Warehouse II" (Mass, Johnny Klimek, Reinhold Heil) (2:44)
 "Warehouse III" (Mass, Johnny Klimek, Reinhold Heil) (2:37)
 "Toilet Fight/Showdown" (Johnny Klimek, Reinhold Heil) (4:13)

Box office
Deck Dogz grossed $286,708 at the box office in Australia.

See also
 Cinema of Australia
 South Australian Film Corporation
 Tony Hawk
 Skateboarding

References

External links
 
 Deck Dogz at the National Film and Sound Archive

2005 films
Australian coming-of-age drama films
2000s sports drama films
Australian sports drama films
Films shot in Adelaide
Films shot in Sydney
Films set in Sydney
Australian independent films
Skateboarding films
Australian teen drama films
2000s teen drama films
Films scored by Reinhold Heil
Films scored by Johnny Klimek
2005 independent films
2000s English-language films